Castilleja, commonly known as paintbrush, Indian paintbrush, or prairie-fire, is a genus of about 200 species of annual and perennial herbaceous plants native to the west of the Americas from Alaska south to the Andes, northern Asia, and one species as far west as the Kola Peninsula in northwestern Russia. These plants are classified in the broomrape family Orobanchaceae (following major rearrangements of the order Lamiales starting around 2001; sources which do not follow these reclassifications may place them in the Scrophulariaceae). They are hemiparasitic on the roots of grasses and forbs. The generic name honors Spanish botanist Domingo Castillejo.

Ecology

Castilleja species are eaten by the larvae of some lepidopteran species, including Schinia cupes (which has been recorded on C. exserta) and Schinia pulchripennis (which feeds exclusively on C. exserta), and checkerspot butterflies, such as Euphydryas species. Pollinators aid these plants in reproduction, with insects visiting the flowers, as well as hummingbirds for some species.

Castilleja species can play an important role in plant community dynamics and multitrophic interactions. For example, Castilleja hemiparasitic reliance on other plant species may affect competition and dominance among other plant species in its community. Additionally, the foliage of some Castilleja species naturally contains defensive compounds that are sequestered in the tissues of larvae of specialist insect species that have developed a tolerance for these compounds and are able to consume the foliage. These sequestered compounds then confer chemical protection against predators to larvae.

Hybridization

Some species in the Castilleja genus are able to hybridize, especially when ploidy levels match, and hybrids may produce viable seed. This hybridization potential has been identified as a threat to the genetic integrity of certain endangered Castilleja species.

Uses
The flowers of Indian paintbrush are edible, and were consumed in moderation by various Native American tribes as a condiment with other fresh greens. These plants have a tendency to absorb and concentrate selenium in their tissues from the soils in which they grow, and can be potentially very toxic if the roots or green parts of the plant are consumed. Highly alkaline soils increase the selenium levels in the plants. Indian paintbrush has similar health benefits to consuming garlic, though only if the flowers are eaten in small amounts and in moderation.

Symbolism
Castilleja linariifolia is the state flower of Wyoming.

Selected species

References

Further reading

External links
  Native Plant Information Network: Listing of species in the Castilleja genus.
 Jepson Manual - taxonomic description of the genus.
 Extensive Castilleja species gallery by Mark Egger

 
Parasitic plants
Orobanchaceae genera